The People's Liberation Army is the armed forces of the People's Republic of China. It may also refer to:

Africa 
 Ambazonia Defence Forces (ADF) is the people’s army of Ambazonia, former British Southern Cameroons fighting a self defense campaign to restore independence.
 Azanian People's Liberation Army, the armed wing of the Pan Africanist Congress during the Apartheid years
 People's Liberation Army of Namibia, the armed forces of SWAPO during the Namibian national liberation struggle
 Saharawi People's Liberation Army, the army of the Sahrawi Arab Democratic Republic and former the armed wing of the Frente POLISARIO that also struggles for national liberation
 Sudan People's Liberation Army, the army of the Republic of South Sudan.

Asia 
 People's Liberation Army of Kurdistan (ARGK), the armed wing of the Kurdistan Workers Party (PKK)
 People's Liberation Army (Nepal), the armed wing of the Communist Party of Nepal (Maoist)
 People's Liberation Army of Manipur,  separatist armed group fighting for an independent state of Manipur, a state in northeastern India
 Pathet Lao, officially called the Lao People's Liberation Army starting in 1965
 People's Liberation Guerrilla Army (India), the armed wing of the Communist Party of India (Maoist)
 People's Liberation Army of Turkey (THKO), a left-wing group founded in 1970. Several splinter-groups have used versions of the name:
People's Liberation Army of Turkey-United Struggle
People's Liberation Army of Turkey-Revolutionary Path of Turkey

Europe 
 Irish National Liberation Army, sometimes went under the name of People's Liberation Army
 People's Liberation Army and Partisan Detachments of Yugoslavia (known simply as "the Partisans" or "Yugoslav Partisans") the anti-fascist resistance army in Yugoslavia, led by Josip Broz Tito
 Greek People's Liberation Army, the anti-fascist resistance army in Greece

Middle East 
 People’s Liberation Army (Lebanon), the armed wing of the Progressive Socialist Party (PSP) of Lebanon (Marxist-Leninist)

South America 
 Popular Liberation Army (Colombia), the armed wing of the Communist Party of Colombia (Marxist-Leninist)

See also 
People's Army (disambiguation)
People's Revolutionary Army (disambiguation)